Leon Berkowitz (1911–1987) was an American artist and educator. He is best known for his color field paintings and the series, The Unities. He co-founded the Washington Workshop Center, a gallery and school. 

Berkowitz was a leading member of the art movement, the Washington Color School. Berkowitz did not like the label of, "Washington Color School" and often rejected it for his own work.

Biography 

Leon Berkowitz was born on 14 September 1911 in Philadelphia, Pennsylvania, to parents Yettie (née Pries) and Bernard Berkowitz. His parents were Hasidic, from Hungary. His date of birth sometimes has a different listed date (including 1915, 1919), and his place of birth has also been listed as nearby Trenton Township. Between 1935 and 1937, he married poet . 

He attended the University of Pennsylvania, the Art Students League of New York (1941), the Corcoran College of Art and Design, and the Académie de la Grande Chaumière. During World War II between 1943 to 1945, Berkowitz served in the United States Army and was stationed in Virginia.  

After his service he moved to Washington D.C. and co-founded the Washington Workshop Center (also known as the Workshop Art Center or Washington Workshop Center for the Arts) alongside his wife Ida Fox Berkowitz and artist . The workshop offered classes, workspace, and a gallery. The center became a key gathering place for the Washington Color School artists, including Morris Louis, Kenneth Noland, Howard Mehring, Thomas Downing, and Gene Davis. One of Berkowitz' students at the workshop was Scott Burton.

His paintings were abstract, and softly radiated colors and tones that one might found in nature.

Death and legacy 
Berkowitz died on 17 August 1987. His work can be found in public collections, including at Smithsonian American Art Museum, Des Moines Art Center, National Gallery of Art, Corcoran Gallery of Art, John and Mable Ringling Museum of Art, the Phillips Collection, Museum of Modern Art, the Aldrich Museum of Contemporary Art, the Wadsworth Atheneum, the High Museum of Art, and the Kalamazoo Institute of Arts.

Berkowitz' work was featured in the postmortem exhibition, Hard and Soft (2002) at ACA Galleries in New York City. His work was in the exhibit, Painting the Picture (2018–2019), at Museum of Contemporary Art Jacksonville.

References

External links 
 Leon Berkowitz and Ida Fox Berkowitz papers, circa 1900-1986, Archives of American Art, Smithsonian Institution

1987 deaths
1911 births
American people of Hungarian-Jewish descent
Jewish American artists
Abstract painters
University of Pennsylvania alumni
Art Students League of New York alumni
Corcoran School of the Arts and Design alumni
United States Army personnel of World War II